Michael Daingerfield is a Canadian actor, acting coach and founder of On The Mic Training, a voice acting school in Vancouver, British Columbia.

He is best known for his voice roles of Ace Ventura in Ace Ventura: Pet Detective, playing Gordon Godfrey on the CW's superhero drama Smallville, and his English dub of the anime as Gintoki Sakata in Gintama.

Early life and education
Daingerfield attended Murray State University in Kentucky on a tennis scholarship. He graduated with a degree in business and administration.

Career
Michael Daingerfield's very first voice acting job was playing Ace Ventura on the Nickelodeon/CBS cartoon series of the same name. 
According to Dan Hennessey the Voice Director for Ace Ventura: Pet Detective, Daingerfield did a few of Jim Carrey's ADR lines in the second Ace Venutra movie (Ace Ventura: When Nature Calls), when Mr. Carrey was unavailable to do them himself.

In 2006, Daingerfield wrote, produced and starred in, "Daingerfield", a short feature loosely based on his life.

In 2007, Daingerfield founded On the Mic Training, a Vancouver based, voice acting school where he and many other Vancouver voice actors train students in voice-over.

In 2017, he was cast as the lead role of Gintoki Sakata in the Ocean dub of Gintama.

Personal life
In 2007, Daingerfield ranked third in Canada for Men's Singles over 35 tennis.

Filmography

Anime

Animation

Film

Live-action

Video games

Awards

Leo Awards

References

External links
 
 
 

Living people
Canadian male film actors
Canadian male television actors
Canadian male video game actors
Canadian male voice actors
Year of birth missing (living people)
Place of birth missing (living people)